Kealsie Monique Robles (born February 28, 1997) is an American field hockey goalkeeper who plays for the US national team.

Career 
Robles played for Old Dominion University, where she started playing in 2015. She was named Big East Defensive Player of the Week in her first career start for Old Dominion University. During her college career, she started in 51 games. In 2018 she was selected for the US national team. Both in 2019 and 2020 she was part of the US team that competed in the FIH Pro League.

References

External links 
 
 Kealsie Monique Robles at Lima 2019

Female field hockey goalkeepers
American female field hockey players
Living people
1997 births
21st-century American women